Yousuf Al-Matrooshi (born 1 June 2003) is an Emirati swimmer. He competed in the men's 100 metre freestyle at the 2020 Summer Olympics.

References

External links
 

2003 births
Living people
Emirati male swimmers
Emirati male freestyle swimmers
Olympic swimmers of the United Arab Emirates
Swimmers at the 2020 Summer Olympics
Sportspeople from Dubai